Lake Grassmere / Kapara Te Hau is a New Zealand waituna-type lagoon in the northeastern South Island, close to Cook Strait. The lake is used for the production of salt.

Geography 
It is on the north-easterly extension of the Ward depression.

Close to the sea, it also has a very high salinity.

Because of these geographical characteristics, it is ideal for natural salt extraction. Grassmere has been divided into solar evaporation ponds. Seawater is pumped in, and moved between ponds over several months, increasing in salinity with each successive evaporation period. As salinity increases, crystallised salt forms and is extracted.

The watershed is small.

Early history 
The Māori name for the lake is Kapara Te Hau ("wind-blown lake"). Early whalers on the coast rendered this name “Cobblers' Hole”.

According to Māori oral tradition, the lake occupies the site of early cultivations. Kupe, the navigator, is said to have poured salt water on these cultivations, thus creating the lake.

In pre-European times it was used as a ready source of food, as it attracts a wide range of waterfowl.

In 1832–33, a year after Ngāti Toa under the leadership of Te Rauparaha had defeated Ngāi Tahu at Kaiapoi and Banks Peninsula, Ngāti Toa visited the lake to take moulting ducks. A Ngāi Tahu force, having learned of this impending visit, laid an ambush. Scouts from Te Rauparaha's party found the locality apparently uninhabited and the canoes were driven ashore. On landing, the visitors were taken by surprise and sustained heavy casualties. Te Rauparaha was seized by Tūhawaiki, who was anxious to take him alive. The captive, however, after feigning resignation, was less tightly held. He then slipped out of his flax garment, swam to a canoe and made his escape.

Salt industry 
Until the 1940s Grassmere's bed was a mud bath in winter and a dustbowl in summer, with the occasional natural deposit of salt.

The 1960 production was 17,000 tons.
 The total consumption of industrial and domestic salt in New Zealand in 1960 was about 61,000 tons.
 Maximum expansion could produce 50,000 tons, and many economic by-products can be developed; caustic soda and gypsum are already produced in small quantities.
 In 2005 Lake Grassmere provided about half of New Zealand's domestic salt requirements.

In addition to low rainfall, Grassmere is perfectly suited to solar salt production.
 The large area of flat land that makes up the lake bed is near the sea so it can draw in salt water, and away from large rivers.
 High evaporation from sun and wind occurs during summer, and the site has ready access to both sea and rail transport.

In the mid 1960s harvests were carried out with a new pattern of crystallising ponds which have special provision for draining off rainwater before it has had time to mix with the brine concentrate.

The harvest for 1964–65 reached 30,000 tons, a record at the time.

By 1970 the harvest had increased to almost 52,000 tonnes, but this could not match demand, which had grown with industrial development (especially from freezing works and pulp and paper mills). It became evident that Grassmere could not meet New Zealand's salt requirements.

Bulk shipments of salt from the Caribbean and Australia were landed at Mt Maunganui, where a vacuum salt plant was built. This produced the high-purity salt needed by producers in the dairy and pharmaceutical industries. A second, smaller vacuum plant was built at Grassmere.

Some rolling stock from the railway at Grassmere salt works is preserved at the Ferrymead Two Foot Railway.

Economics 
A large range of salts with slightly different chemical compositions, grain sizes and shapes are produced at Lake Grassmere. All table salt produced in New Zealand is solar salt, and both iodised and non-iodised table salt are available.

Iodised salt contains added iodine (to prevent goitre) and silicon dioxide (to make the salt run). Specialty salts, including flaky salt, are also produced at Lake Grassmere.

Animal health products such as salt licks for farm animals are produced at Grassmere and Mt Maunganui.

At the end of summer Grassmere's gleaming white salt piles are easily seen from State Highway 1. This seasonal landmark forms a vivid contrast to the burnt brown of the Marlborough hills.

Seismic activity
A fault running underneath Lake Grassmere triggered a magnitude 6.6 earthquake on Friday, August 16, 2013 at 2:31:05 pm.

Official name
The official name of the lake become a dual name as a result of the Ngāi Tahu Claims Settlement Act 1998.

References

External links
 Salt making at Lake Grassmere in Te Ara – the Encyclopedia of New Zealand

Lagoons of New Zealand
Lakes of the Marlborough Region
Saline lakes of Oceania